Skinner is a 1993 independent splatter / slasher film directed by Ivan Nagy and starring Ted Raimi, Traci Lords, Ricki Lake and Richard Schiff.

Synopsis
Dennis Skinner is a likeable, decent-looking lad who, driven by a disturbing childhood, moonlights as a skid row slasher-style serial killer preying on sex workers, in-between those co-workers of his who despise him as he does in return. He "punishes" those he finds offensive, by flaying his victims alive. On his trail is Heidi (Traci Lords), a junkie prostitute who survived one of his brutal attacks and now desires revenge.

Cast
 Ted Raimi as Dennis Skinner
 Traci Lords as Heidi
 Ricki Lake as Kerry Tate
 Richard Schiff as Eddie
 David Warshofsky as Geoff Tate
 Blaire Baron as Gloria
 Christina Englehardt as Rachel
 Time Winters as Night Watchman
 Roberta Eaton as Sandy
 De Wayne Williams as Earl
 Frederika Kesten as Suzanne
 Sara Lee Froton as Young Woman

References

External links

American independent films
American slasher films
1993 horror films
Films directed by Ivan Nagy
1993 films
1990s English-language films
1990s American films